The 1914–15 City Cup was the twenty-first edition of the City Cup, a cup competition in Irish football.

The tournament was won by Glentoran for the sixth time and second consecutive year. One match between Cliftonville and Bohemians was unplayed.

Group standings

References

1914–15 in Irish association football